The First Hashimoto Cabinet was formed in January 1996 under the leadership of Ryutaro Hashimoto, following the resignation of Tomiichi Murayama as Prime Minister of Japan and head of the coalition between the Liberal Democratic Party, Japan Socialist Party and New Party Sakigake. The smaller Socialist party relinquished the leadership of the government to the LDP, which was the largest party in the Diet and Hashimoto (LDP President since September 1995) assumed the premiership, becoming the first LDP Prime Minister since August 1993.

The three-party coalition continued, although all ministers from the Murayama Cabinet were replaced. The Socialists renamed themselves as the Social Democratic Party and Secretary-general Wataru Kubo became Deputy Prime Minister and Finance Minister. The cabinet lasted until November 1996, when it was dissolved following the 1996 general election and replaced with the Second Hashimoto Cabinet.

Election of the Prime Minister

Ministers 

R = Member of the House of Representatives
C = Member of the House of Councillors

References

External links 
 List of Ministers at the Kantei: First Hashimoto Cabinet 

Cabinet of Japan
1996 establishments in Japan
1996 disestablishments in Japan
Cabinets established in 1996
Cabinets disestablished in 1996